South Korea (IOC designation:Korea) participated in the 1990 Asian Winter Games held in Sapporo, Japan from March 9, 1990 to March 14, 1990.

Medal summary

Medal table

Medalists

References

Asian Winter Games
Nations at the 1990 Asian Winter Games
South Korea at the Asian Winter Games